Mwalimu Julius Kambarage Nyerere Museum  is located at Butiama village - the birth and burial place of the Father of The nation in, Butiama District, Mara Region in Tanzania.  The museum was officially opened by the Prime minister of the United Republic of Tanzania, Hon. Frederick Tluway Sumaye on 2 July 1999.  Julius Nyerere also attended the opening ceremony.  

It hosts various items for public display by Mwalimu Julius Kambarage Nyerere.  The items include those which:
Received during the technical challenges for country's independence.
Given as gifts during his presidency.
Personally used in his farm in his home village of Butiama, Tanzania.
Received as he was stepping down from the presidency in the year 1985.

References

See also 
 List of museums in Tanzania

Museums in Tanzania
Julius Nyerere
Butiama
Museums established in 1999
1999 establishments in Tanzania
Buildings and structures in the Mara Region
Tourist attractions in the Mara Region